Janice Knickrehm (June 4, 1925 – January 23, 2013) was an American actress who appeared in numerous Salt Lake City-based film productions, and is perhaps best known for her role in the film Halloween: The Curse of Michael Myers, as Ms. Blankenship.

Knickrehm made an appearance at the 25th anniversary fan convention for Halloween held in Pasadena, California in 2003. She participated in a discussion panel that consisted of Kim Darby, Bradford English, and Marianne Hagan, among others, that allowed fans attending the event to ask questions of the cast and crew about the film and their experiences on the set. She died at age 87.

Personal life
Knickrehm was married to her husband, Gus for many years before his death on January 21, 1990. Together they had seven children; five sons - Gene, John, Honore, Matthew and Gus, and two daughters - Maggie and Elizabeth.

Filmography

External links

References

1925 births
2013 deaths
American film actresses
American stage actresses
Actresses from Boston
Actresses from Utah
21st-century American women